"Who'll Stop the Rain" is a song written by John Fogerty and originally recorded by Creedence Clearwater Revival for their 1970 album Cosmo's Factory. Backed with "Travelin' Band", it was one of three double-sided singles from that album to reach the top five on the Billboard Pop Singles chart and the first of two to reach the No. 2 spot on the American charts, alongside "Lookin' Out My Back Door"/"Long As I Can See the Light". In 2004, Rolling Stone ranked it No. 188 on its "500 Greatest Songs of All Time" list.

History
Lyrically, "Who'll Stop the Rain" breaks into three verses, with a historical, recent past, and present tense approach. All three verses allude to a sense of unending malaise, pondered by "good men through the ages", "Five Year Plans and New Deals/wrapped in golden chains", and the Woodstock generation.

Musically, in contrast to the 1950s-Rock-inspired "Travelin' Band", "Who'll Stop the Rain" has more of an acoustic, folk-rock feel to it. Like many folk-rock songs, it starts off with a ringing acoustic guitar riff, though the backing throughout has more of a roots rock sound than that heard on more standard folk-rock recordings. Interpreting the song in its time period (1970), and the resigned but somewhat angry feeling of the song, many see "Who'll Stop the Rain" as a thinly veiled protest against the Vietnam War, with the final verse lyrics and its references to music, large crowds, rain, and crowds trying to keep warm being about the band's experience at the Woodstock Festival in August 1969. For his part, when asked by Rolling Stone about the meaning of the song's lyrics, John Fogerty was quoted as saying,

In 2007 during a concert in Shelburne, Vermont, he said the following about the song:

Ultimate Classic Rock critic Bryan Wawzenek rated the lyrics of "Who'll Stop the Rain" as Fogerty's 3rd greatest, saying "It appears that he feels the efforts to solve widespread maladies are futile, whether it’s the intelligentsia, politicians or the Woodstock generation who are doing the fixing. It’s Fogerty’s most cleverly written allegory."

Other versions
Bruce Springsteen occasionally performs the song. The song was a concert staple during his 1980-81 River Tour, as well as on the summer 2003 leg of the Rising Tour. Springsteen and the E Street Band opened with "Who'll Stop the Rain" whenever it was raining.

When Creedence Clearwater Revival was inducted into the Rock and Roll Hall of Fame in 1993, Springsteen performed the song with John Fogerty. The song has also been covered by Rudy Rotta, Rod Stewart, Rise Against, Courtney Jaye, The Ventures, and Vince Neil and was included on John Fogerty's 1998 live CD/DVD Premonition. The Stereophonics have also covered the song as a B-side to their single "Local Boy in the Photograph".

Microdisney performed the song live, frequently in 1984 and on at least one occasion in 1985. Their version of the song was rearranged in their style, at a faster tempo with additional instrumental parts. Usually the song had guitarist Sean O'Hagan performing vocals on it, but regular singer Cathal Coughlan sang on the 1985 version.

Engelbert Humperdinck included "Who'll Stop the Rain" on his 2009 album A Taste of Country.

On Fogerty's 2013 album Wrote a Song for Everyone, he re-recorded the song as a duet with Bob Seger.

Garth Brooks recorded the song for the 2013 The Melting Pot album in the "Blame It All on My Roots: Five Decades of Influences" compilation.

Dwight Yoakam released a version of the song as a single in 2014, after his character, Lyle Chumley, sang a fragment of the song in the "Force Majeure" episode of Under the Dome.

Bill Haley and the Comets recorded a version of this song on their album "Rock Around the Country".

It was also recorded by Ronnie Hawkins and The Hawks in 1986. In '86 they would have been called The Band but they paired up with Hawkins again for one album.

Use in media

Film
In 1978, the song was used in the film Who'll Stop the Rain. The movie starred Nick Nolte as a Vietnam veteran. It was originally going to be called Dog Soldiers after the source novel, but when the producers got the rights to use the song, they changed the title to it. The song also appeared in the 1989 film Powwow Highway. Both the original song and a softer, slower cover version sung by Courtney Jaye are included in the soundtrack of December Boys. A clip of the song appears in the film The War. The song was also included in the movie Philadelphia. In 1990 it was also used in a third-season episode of Tour Of Duty, a TV action-drama series that followed the fortunes of a U.S. Army platoon during the Vietnam War. The song features in Haruki Murakami's novel "Hear the Wind Sing" which was later made into a film. The song also is featured in the 2023 Netflix film We Have a Ghost, as Kevin plays the song in an attempt to induce Ernest to materialize.

Commercials
Creedence Clearwater Revival songs appeared in many films and commercials, in part because John Fogerty signed away legal control of his old recordings to Creedence's record label, Fantasy Records. Fogerty objected to what he regarded as a misuse of his music in an NPR interview:
Folks will remember Forrest Gump and that was a great movie, but they don't remember all the really poor movies that Fantasy Records stuck Creedence music into: car commercials, tire commercials. I'm remembering a paint thinner ad at one point (actually, it was Thompson's Water Seal), the song "Who'll Stop the Rain". Oh, boy. That's clever, isn't it?

Charts and certification

Weekly charts

Certifications and sales

References

External links
 
Lyrics of "Who'll Stop the Rain"

1970 singles
American folk rock songs
Creedence Clearwater Revival songs
Fantasy Records singles
Garth Brooks songs
Song recordings produced by John Fogerty
Songs about depression
Songs about weather
Songs written by John Fogerty